Greatest Hits is a compilation album by Seals and Crofts, released in November 1975 by Warner Bros. Records. It includes a new recording of the song "When I Meet Them," of which the first version appeared on Year of Sunday. The other songs were the same versions released on their previous four albums.

Track listing 
All songs written by James Seals and Dash Crofts, except where noted.
 "When I Meet Them" – 3:38
 "Diamond Girl" – 4:10
 "Hummingbird" – 4:35
 "Castles in the Sand" – 4:05
 "East of Ginger Trees" – 3:46
 "I'll Play for You" – 4:04
 "Ruby Jean and Billie Lee" – 4:07
 "King of Nothing" (Seals) – 3:19
 "Summer Breeze" – 3:24
 "We May Never Pass This Way (Again)" – 4:15

Charts

Weekly charts

Year-end charts

References

Seals and Crofts albums
1975 greatest hits albums
Warner Records compilation albums